Stenocladius is an Asian genus of fireflies or glow-worms in the subfamily Ototretinae.

Species 
BioLib lists the following species:
 Stenocladius azumai Nakane, 1981
 Stenocladius bicoloripes Pic, 1918
 Stenocladius ceylonicus Wittmer, 1979
 Stenocladius chinensis Geisthardt, 2004
 Stenocladius davidis Fairmaire, 1878
 Stenocladius distinctus (Bourgeois, 1909)
 Stenocladius fairmairei (Bourgeois, 1890)
 Stenocladius flavipennis Kawashima, 1999
 Stenocladius horni (Bourgeois, 1905)
 Stenocladius rufithorax Wittmer, 1995
 Stenocladius shirakii Nakane, 1981
 Stenocladius yoshikawai Nakane, 1981
 Stenocladius yoshimasai Kawashima, 1999

References

External links
 

Lampyridae genera
Beetles of Asia